Events from the year 1994 in Scotland.

Incumbents 

 Secretary of State for Scotland and Keeper of the Great Seal – Ian Lang

Law officers 
 Lord Advocate – Lord Rodger of Earlsferry
 Solicitor General for Scotland – Thomas Dawson

Judiciary 
 Lord President of the Court of Session and Lord Justice General – Lord Hope
 Lord Justice Clerk – Lord Ross
 Chairman of the Scottish Land Court – Lord Philip

Events 
 March – Strathclyde water referendum indicates overwhelming opposition to the privatisation of water.
 5 May – elections are held for Scotland's Regional Councils.
 19 May – Robert Black, jailed for life four years ago for abducting a seven-year-old girl in the Scottish Borders, is found guilty of murdering three girls in the 1980s and sentenced to life imprisonment with a recommended minimum term of 35 years. Black later dies in HMP Maghaberry in Northern Ireland of a heart attack in January 2016.
 25 April – Dundee Institute of Technology elevated to the status of Abertay University.
 2 June – Chinook crash on Mull of Kintyre: An RAF Chinook helicopter carrying more than twenty leading intelligence experts crashes on the Mull of Kintyre, killing everyone on board.
 9 June – European elections result in Labour winning six of Scotland's eight MEPs, with the SNP winning the other two.
 25 June – The Greenock rail accident, caused by vandals placing concrete blocks on the rails, kills two people.
 30 June – Monklands East by-election results in the Labour Party retaining the seat despite a swing of 19.2% to the SNP.
 3 November – The Local Government etc. (Scotland) Act 1994, that will reorganise local government by creating 32 unitary authorities, receives royal assent.
 Dounreay nuclear power plant comes offline.
 Highland Theological Institute established in Dingwall.

Births 
 1 January – Craig Murray, footballer
 14 January – Ross Murdoch, swimmer
 8 March – Claire Emslie, footballer
 11 March - Andrew Robertson, footballer
 12 March – Katie Archibald, cyclist
 23 March – Jack Hamilton, goalkeeper
 10 April – Siobhan Hunter, footballer
 29 April – Stephen Milne, swimmer
 24 May – Emily Nicholl, netball player
 11 July – Jake Wightman, middle-distance runner
 30 August – Jo Muir, modern pentathlete
 12 September – Mhairi Black, SNP MP for Paisley and Renfrewshire South

Deaths 
 3 January – Marion Ross, physicist (born 1903)
 12 May – John Smith, leader of the Labour Party (UK) (born 1938)
 6 June – Mark McManus, film and television actor (born 1935)
 14 June – Denys Hay, historian (born 1915 in England)
 Rhoda Bulter, poet (born 1929)

Arts and literature 
 9 May – release of Scottish group Wet Wet Wet's cover of the song Love Is All Around (1967), as featured in the recently released film Four Weddings and a Funeral. From 29 May it will spend 15 consecutive weeks at number one in the UK Singles Chart, the longest spell ever attained by a British act.
 June – the old Empire Palace Theatre in Edinburgh reopens permanently as the Edinburgh Festival Theatre.
 23 August – K Foundation enact K Foundation Burn a Million Quid on the Ardfin Estate on Jura.
 August – Theresa Breslin's young adult novel Whispers in the Graveyard is published.
 James Kelman's stream of consciousness novel How Late It Was, How Late, written in Glasgow patter, is published.
 Alternative rock band Snow Patrol is formed by students from Northern Ireland at the University of Dundee.

See also 

 1994 in England
 1994 in Northern Ireland
 1994 in Wales

References 

 
Scotland
Years of the 20th century in Scotland
1990s in Scotland